Purda Leśna  is a village in the administrative district of Gmina Purda, within Olsztyn County, Warmian-Masurian Voivodeship, in northern Poland. It is located within the historic region of Warmia.

The village has a population of 80.

References

Villages in Olsztyn County